The 1987–88 Combined Counties Football League season was the tenth in the history of the Combined Counties Football League, a football competition in England.

The league was won by British Aerospace (Weybridge) for the third time.

League table

The league remained at 18 clubs after Virginia Water left the league, and one new club joined:

Bedfont, joining from the Surrey Premier League.

References

External links
 Combined Counties League Official Site

1987-88
1987–88 in English football leagues